Macmurtryseius is a genus of mites in the Phytoseiidae family.

Species
The genus Macmurtryseius contains the following species:
 Macmurtryseius armellae (Schicha & Gutierrez, 1985)
 Macmurtryseius christinae (Schicha, 1981)
 Macmurtryseius hebridensis (McMurtry & Moraes, 1984)

References

Phytoseiidae